The Women's balance beam competition at the 2022 Commonwealth Games took place on August 2 at the Arena Birmingham in Birmingham.

Schedule
The schedule was as follows:

All times are British Summer Time (UTC+1)

Results

Qualification

Qualification for this apparatus final was determined within the team final.

Final
The results are as follows:

References

Women's
2022 in women's gymnastics